Alex Toker is currently a professor at the Department of Pathology at Beth Israel Deaconess Medical Center, Harvard Medical School and Chief of the Division of Signal Transduction and Associate Director of the Cancer Research Institute in the Cancer Center. His research focus on understanding mechanism of cancer including tumor cell survival, invasion and metastasis. 
He is currently editor-in-chief of the Journal of Biological Chemistry.

References 

American pathologists
Living people
Year of birth missing (living people)
Place of birth missing (living people)
Cancer researchers
Harvard Medical School faculty
Academic journal editors
Alumni of the University of London